Noureddine Adam (born 1970) is the leader of the Central African rebel group, the Popular Front for the Rebirth of Central African Republic (FPRC) in the Central African Republic Civil War.

Early career
An ethnic Runga, he was born in 1970 in N'Délé. His father was an imam who served as the leader of the Muslim community in Miskine neighborhood of Bangui. His mother was a Chadian. After completing secondary school, Adam was trained in Sudan and then in Egypt, where he graduated from the police academy in Cairo in the 1990s after spending 10 years in Egypt. After that, he was trained by the Israeli Special Forces for six months and then settled for a year in Bangui where he was assigned to the Central Office for the Suppression of Banditism (OCRB). During the early 2000s, he was hired as a guardsman in various Persian Gulf countries. From 2003 to 2009, he stayed in the UAE and was a bodyguard of President Zayed bin Sultan Al Nahyan. In 2009, he returned to Central African Republic and joined the CPJP rebel group. Following the disappearance of Charles Massi in 2010, he became the leader of CPJP.

2013 conflict
He was second in command to Michel Djotodia of the Seleka coalition of rebels. In March 2013, he played a decisive role in the final offensive in Bangui, which overthrew incumbent President François Bozizé. After seizing power, President Djotodia later appointed him as Minister of Public Security on 31 March 2013 but he was dismissed on 22 August 2013 and was appointed as national security adviser. After Seleka was officially disbanded in September 2013, Ex-seleka fighters formed new militias with the largest being FPRC, which was formed in May 2014 and initially led by Djotodia. He was sanctioned by the UN on 9 May 2014 for involving in diamond trafficking between CAR and Chad. As leader of FPRC, Noureddine Adam declared the autonomous Republic of Logone or Dar El Kuti on 14 December 2015 and intended Bambari as the capital, with the transitional government denouncing the declaration and the UN peacekeeping mission MINUSCA stating it will use force against any separatist attempt. By late 2016, the civil war was largely fighting between FPRC and a rival Exseleka faction called the Union for Peace in the Central African Republic (UPC) led by Ali Darassa.

On 17 December 2020, an FPRC faction led by Noureddine Adam joined the Coalition of Patriots for Change, while the faction led by Abdoulaye Hissene remained committed to the 2019 peace agreement.

On 28 July 2022, the ICC made public an arrest warrant against Noureddine Adam suspected of crimes against humanity and war crimes..

References

Central African Republic Muslims
Central African Republic military personnel
People from Bamingui-Bangoran
1970 births
Living people
Central African Republic expatriates in Egypt
Central African Republic expatriates in Sudan
Central African Republic expatriates in the United Arab Emirates
African warlords
People of the Central African Republic Civil War
Fugitives wanted by the International Criminal Court